Parrish is an unincorporated community in Cave Township, Franklin County, Illinois, United States.

History
Once a larger town, Parrish was destroyed by the Tri-State Tornado in 1925. The town, which consisted of roughly 250 residents and 40 buildings at the time, suffered a 27% casualty rate and lost all but three of its buildings: one house, the Primitive Methodist Church, and the Parrish School. As the tornado destroyed all of the town's means of outside communication, the disaster was only discovered by a passing Illinois Central train, which returned to Thompsonville to notify the surrounding towns. Much of the town's surviving population moved away following the tornado, and the town never rebuilt its infrastructure; it is now a dispersed rural community.

References

Unincorporated communities in Franklin County, Illinois
Unincorporated communities in Illinois